Denis Matthew Griffin (26 June 1882 – 9 July 1969) was an Australian rules football player who played with St Kilda and South Melbourne in the Victorian Football League (VFL).

Notes

External links 
		

1882 births
1969 deaths
Australian rules footballers from Victoria (Australia)
St Kilda Football Club players
Sydney Swans players